Iwao Miyajima (2 May 1914 – 21 June 2005) was a Japanese ski jumper. He competed in the individual event at the 1936 Winter Olympics.

References

1914 births
2005 deaths
Japanese male ski jumpers
Olympic ski jumpers of Japan
Ski jumpers at the 1936 Winter Olympics
Sportspeople from Hokkaido